Central Command may refer to:

 United States Central Command
 AFP Central Command (Philippines)
 Central Command (India)
 Central Command (Israel)